Zora G. Clevenger (December 12, 1881 – November 24, 1970) was an American football, basketball, and baseball player, coach, and pioneering athletic director. He served as the head football coach at Nebraska Wesleyan University (1908–1910), the University of Tennessee (1911–1915), and Kansas State University (1916–1919), compiling a record of 47–32–7. Clevenger was also the head basketball coach at Indiana University (1904–1906), Nebraska Wesleyan (1907–1911), Tennessee (1911–1916), and Kansas State (1916–1919), and was baseball coach at Indiana (1905–1906), Nebraska Wesleyan (1908–1911), Tennessee (1911–1916), and Kansas State (1919–1921). Clevenger served as the athletic director at Kansas State (1916–1920), the University of Missouri (1921–1923), and Indiana (1923–1946). He was inducted into the College Football Hall of Fame as a player in 1968.

Playing career
Clevenger was a star 5'7", 145-pound left halfback on the Indiana Hoosiers football team at Indiana University Bloomington from 1900 to 1903. Although little more than jockey-sized, he was the school's first great Hall of Fame athlete. Clevenger also played baseball, as a shortstop, and basketball at Indiana. He was captain of all three squads.

In 1902 the Indiana baseball team closed their season at home against Minnesota. Clevenger came to bat down 10–8, two on, two out, last of the ninth. He hit a home run to win the game. Later he said, "It wasn't a big school then, but the students got together, took up a collection, and went uptown and bought me a gold watch. It's one of my most prized possessions."

As a senior and captain on the football team in 1903, Clevenger kicked a field goal, ran a punt back for a touchdown, and led his team to a shocking 17–0 win over Illinois. The crowd of 1,500 carried Clevenger and other Hoosiers off the field, then marched behind the band downtown for a celebration that lasted into the night.

Coaching and sports administration career
Following his graduation, Clevenger served as head coach for the basketball and baseball teams at Indiana for two years. He then coached football, basketball, and baseball at Nebraska Wesleyan University from 1908 to 1911.

In 1911, Clevenger moved to the University of Tennessee, where he served as head football, basketball, and baseball coach until 1916. While at Tennessee, he posted a 26–15–2 record in football, including a conference championship and the school's first undefeated season in 1914. At the same time, his 1915–16 basketball team went undefeated, and was acknowledged as the best team in the South. Clevenger also served as athletic director at Tennessee.

Prior to the 1916 football season, Clevenger moved to Kansas State University, where he served as head football coach, head basketball coach, head baseball coach, and as the first athletic director for the school. Curiously, John R. Bender moved from Kansas State to Tennessee at the same time, so the two schools in effect swapped football coaches. Clevenger's football teams at Kansas State had an overall record of 19–9–2. He found even more success in basketball, posting a 54–17 record, still the best winning percentage in school history, and winning two Missouri Valley Conference championships.

In 1921, Clevenger left the coaching profession and moved to the University of Missouri, where he served as athletic director until 1923. In 1923, Clevenger returned to Indiana and became its most venerated athletic director, holding that position for 23 years before retiring in 1946. He was replaced in the position by Bo McMillin. While at Indiana, Clevenger helped found the annual East–West Shrine Game.

Honors
Clevenger was inducted into the College Football Hall of Fame as a player in 1968. The I-Men's Association at Indiana University annually awards a Z. G. Clevenger Award in his honor. It is the highest award given by the organization.

Head coaching record

Football

References

Additional sources
 Stallard, Mark (2000). Wildcats to Powercats: K-State Football Facts and Trivia

External links
 
 

1881 births
1970 deaths
American football drop kickers
American football halfbacks
American men's basketball players
Indiana Hoosiers athletic directors
Indiana Hoosiers baseball coaches
Indiana Hoosiers baseball players
Indiana Hoosiers football players
Indiana Hoosiers men's basketball coaches
Indiana Hoosiers men's basketball players
Kansas State Wildcats athletic directors
Kansas State Wildcats baseball coaches
Kansas State Wildcats football coaches
Kansas State Wildcats men's basketball coaches
Missouri Tigers athletic directors
Nebraska Wesleyan Prairie Wolves baseball coaches
Nebraska Wesleyan Prairie Wolves football coaches
Nebraska Wesleyan Prairie Wolves men's basketball coaches
Tennessee Volunteers baseball coaches
Tennessee Volunteers basketball coaches
Tennessee Volunteers football coaches
College Football Hall of Fame inductees
Sportspeople from Muncie, Indiana
Coaches of American football from Indiana
Players of American football from Indiana
Baseball coaches from Indiana
Baseball players from Indiana
Basketball coaches from Indiana
Basketball players from Indiana